The deep-sea smelts are any members of the family Bathylagidae, a distinct group of marine smelts.

They feed on plankton, especially krill.

References

 

 
Deep sea fish